John Colshull may refer to:

John Colshull (MP died 1413), MP for Cornwall
John Colshull (MP died 1418), MP for Cornwall